Acleris undulana, the cedar leaf moth, is a species of moth of the family Tortricidae. It is found in Spain, Cyprus, Asia Minor, Syria and Russia (Altai).

The wingspan is 12–14 mm. The forewings are pale greyish cinereous (ash grey), with greyish transverse shading. The hindwings are brownish grey, darkening towards the apex and termen.

The larvae feed on Cedrus libani.

References

Moths described in 1900
undulana
Moths of Europe
Moths of Asia